Horistus is a genus of plant bugs belonging to the family Miridae, subfamily Mirinae.

Species
Species within this genus include:
Horistus bimaculatus (Jakovlev, 1884) 
Horistus elongatus (Wagner, 1951) 
Horistus infuscatus (Brullé, 1832) 
Horistus orientalis (Gmelin, 1790)

References

Miridae genera
Mirini